Rui Rita is an Obie Award-winning New York City based American lighting designer known for his extensive work On- and Off-Broadway.

Career

Broadway 
Source:

Off-Broadway 
Source:

Regional 
Rita continues to work regionally, including accruing over 40 production credits at Williamstown Theater Festival.

Awards and nominations

References

External links 
Rui Rita Website
Rui Rita IBDB
Rui Rita IMDB

Living people
American lighting designers
Year of birth missing (living people)
Place of birth missing (living people)